The Guitar Foundation of America (GFA) is an American classical guitar nonprofit organization that was founded in 1973 at the National Guitar Convention sponsored by the American String Teachers Association. The foundation offers various services ranging from guitar lessons to a guitar shop, competitions, and events. The foundation relies on donations, events, and advertising on its web site for funding. The foundation publishes Soundboard Scholar, a peer-reviewed journal, and Prodigies, a magazine for children.

History
In 1968 the foundation's founder, Thomas Heck, was living in Vienna, Austria, collecting rare sheet music for guitar. His collection included first editions by Mauro Giuliani. In 1973, Heck wrote the foundations' articles of incorporation in Santa Barbara, California, creating a non-profit foundation to which he could give his archive of sheet music. He created the archive in 1977 in Milwaukee while teaching at the Wisconsin Conservatory of Music. A catalog of the inventory was assembled and mailed to interested buyers, who could receive photocopies of sheet music on request. A second edition of the catalog was published four years later. During the 1980s, while Heck taught at Ohio State University in Columbus, the archive grew to include more sheet music, periodicals, and other materials related to classical guitar. In the 1990s, Heck was too busy to oversee the archive, so he sought someone to catalog it correctly, which ended up being the University of Akron. Some of the GFA Archive was entered online at Akron. Heck has also acted as the editor of Soundboard, the foundation's magazine.

International Concert Artist Competition
The foundation holds an International Convention and Competition. The International Concert Artist Competition gives the following prizes to the winner: a recording contract with Naxos, publishing contract, cash, and an international tour.

The first competition was held in 1982. Twenty-three guitarists entered the contest, and there were four finalists. To qualify as finalists, guitarists were required to play three pieces selected by the jurors. Michael Chapdelaine won the first contest, while Adam Holzman won in 1983. Holzman's repertoire included the Fourth Lute Suite by J. S. Bach and Sevilla by Albeniz.

Winners 
Source Official webpage

References

External links

 The Guitar Foundation of America Archive at the University of Akron

Classical guitar
Spanish classical guitar
String instrument organizations